Joscha Bach (born 1973 in Weimar, Germany) is a German artificial intelligence researcher and cognitive scientist focusing on cognitive architectures, mental representation, emotion, social modeling, and multi-agent systems.

Early life and education
Bach was born and grew up in East Germany, part of the last generation to do so, to architect and artist Jochen Bach and Gisa Bach. He is part of the Bach family.

He received an MA (computer science) from Humboldt-Universität Berlin in 2000 and a PhD (cognitive science) from Osnabrück University in 2006.

Roles
Bach has taught computer science, AI, and cognitive science at the Humboldt-University of Berlin and the Institute for Cognitive Science at Osnabrück. He worked as a visiting researcher at the MIT Media Lab and the Harvard Program for Evolutionary Dynamics.

He then joined AI Foundation, working as VP of Research. He is currently a Principal AI Engineer at Intel Labs Cognitive Computing group.

Achievements

Bach built MicroPsi, a cognitive architecture extending representations of the Psi-theory with taxonomies, inheritance and linguistic labeling; MicroPsi's spreading activation networks allow for neural learning, planning and associative retrieval.

He has also worked extensively on  novel data compression algorithm using concurrent entropy models

Other
Bach has written a book on cognitive science called Principles of Synthetic Intelligence. Between 2013 and 2017, Bach was attributed research funding by Jeffrey Epstein charitable funds, according to fact-finding reports from Harvard University and the Massachusetts Institute of Technology.

References

External links

AI Foundation about

Artificial Intelligence with Lex Fridman podcast #101 – Joscha Bach: Artificial Consciousness and the Nature of Reality 

1973 births
Living people
Computer scientists
German cognitive scientists
Artificial intelligence researchers
Scientists from Weimar
Humboldt University of Berlin alumni
Osnabrück University alumni